"My Universe" is a song recorded by British rock band Coldplay and South Korean group BTS. It was released on 24 September 2021, through Parlophone and Atlantic Records, as the second official single from Music of the Spheres, Coldplay's ninth studio album. It debuted at number one on the Billboard Hot 100, becoming BTS' sixth US chart-topper and Coldplay's second after 2008's "Viva la Vida". The single is also the first track by two co-billed lead groups to top the chart and the first song by a British group to debut at number one in the United States' history.

"My Universe" received positive reviews from music critics. It premiered at number three in the UK Singles Chart, claiming the second-biggest week of the year in downloads, and eventually becoming the most downloaded song of 2021 by a group in the country. The track also reached number one in Hungary, Malaysia and Singapore; the top ten in Australia, Belgium, Canada, India, Ireland, and South Korea; and the top twenty of twelve other countries, including Germany, The Netherlands, Norway, and New Zealand.

The official music video, directed by Dave Meyers, was released on 30 September 2021 and features both groups performing on different futuristic planets (Floris, Calypso, and Supersolis) alongside a fictional band named "Supernova 7" via the "Holoband" technology developed by DJ Lafrique, set in an era where music is banned around the universe.

Background

The title of the song was first announced as part of the track listing release of Music of the Spheres in July 2021 without any mention of the song featuring BTS. A snippet of the song was included in a trailer titled "Overtura", also omitting any evidence of the Korean group being involved. On 13 September 2021, the song was revealed to be a collaboration between Coldplay and BTS. The single was announced through a coded message on Coldplay's Alien Radio FM social media account. Following the release of the "Permission to Dance" music video in early July 2021, the groups first collaborated during an episode of the YouTube series Released, during which they joined a discussion with Coldplay's frontman Chris Martin on what inspired the "#PermissionToDance Challenge". However, speculations about a collaboration between the two groups had already started circulating in February 2021, after BTS covered their 2005 hit song "Fix You" on MTV Unplugged. On 26 September, the Inside My Universe making-of documentary of the song was released, alongside a "Supernova 7" remix and an acoustic version. A third remix, done by Suga of BTS, was released on 18 October. Additional remixes by Galantis and David Guetta were released in November. Following the collaboration, Coldplay also wrote a song with BTS member Jin titled "The Astronaut".

Music and Lyrics 
"My Universe" is a synth-pop track, co-written by Martin, Guy Berryman, Jonny Buckland, and Will Champion of Coldplay, as well as BTS members J-Hope, RM, and Suga, as well as Bill Rahko, Oscar Holter, and Max Martin. The lyrics are in both English and Korean. Coldplay originally wrote the song for BTS, but the songwriting process was revised to include the South Korean septet. My Universe is set to a  common time signaure, with a moderately fast tempo of 105 beats per minute. It is written in the key of E major, with the BTS vocal range spanning from the note F♯3 to the note B5. The upbeat gives the synth-rock of Coldplay and the dance-pop of BTS an EDM twist. Coldplay introduces a loud electro-dance outro just before the song ends. Lyrically, the song discusses choosing love above differences with a line like, "And they said that we can't be together because, because we come from different sides." But in the chorus, they dismiss doubters: "You, you are my universe, and I just want to put you first."

Commercial performance 
The song debuted at No. 1 on the Billboard Hot 100 chart in the United States with 11.5 million streams, 5.5 million audience impressions from radio airplay, and 127,000 downloads and physical singles combined. It is BTS' fifth song to enter the Hot 100 at the top, making them the group with the most songs to enter at the top spot. BTS, Ariana Grande, and Drake were tied for first place overall among artists that time. "My Universe" is also the first Hot 100 No.1 song to list two groups as the primary artists. After "Viva La Vida" in 2008, this is notable as being Coldplay's second appearance at the top of the Hot 100.

In addition, "My Universe" topped both the Billboard Global 200 and the Billboard Global Excl charts. U.S. charts. Between September 24 and September 30, the song received 95.4 million streaming and 142,400 downloads globally, with 84.4 million streams and 90,500 downloads occurring outside of the United States. It is BTS's fifth No. 1 on the Global Excl. chart and sixth on the Global 200. Coldplay's debut at No.1 on both charts comes in the U.S.The song also debuts at No. 1 on the Digital Song Sales list, making BTS the group with the most consecutive No. 1 songs on the chart with nine. The song debuted at the top of the Hot Rock & Alternative Songs and Hot Alternative Songs charts and peaked at No. 21 on the Streaming Songs list, No. 23, Alternative Airplay, No. 29, Adult Pop Airplay, and No. 33 on Pop Airplay.

"My Universe" was the top new entry for the week of October 1–7 which debuted at No. 3 on the Official Singles Chart. Notably, with a total of 27,000 pure sales, the single was the best-selling of the week in both physical CDs and digital downloads. The song's 21,400 digital downloads gave it the largest week of downloads of any song this year in the UK. On Oricon's weekly digital singles chart, the song debuted at No. 1. The day after it was released, the song debuted on Spotify's Global Top 200 at No. 3.

Music video
A space-themed lyric video, featuring animated handwritten lyrics from both bands in English and Korean, was released together with the song on 24 September 2021. Additional visualizers for the instrumental and three remix versions of the track were published in the following days.

A music video directed by Dave Meyers was released on 30 September 2021. Set in the Spheres planetary system, where music has been banned by the "Silencers", who appeared in Coldplay's 2011 album Mylo Xyloto. The video depicts Coldplay, BTS, and the fictional alien band Supernova 7 performing "My Universe" together. Though located on different planets, the three groups are united as holograms through "HOLOBAND" technology controlled by alien DJ Lafrique, who broadcasts their performance throughout the system from her radio ship while being hunted by the Silencers. Coldplay filmed the video at an empty, abandoned municipal swimming pool complex in Rubí, Barcelona, in July 2021. The BTS portion was shot on a green-screen stage at a studio in Seoul, South Korea, two weeks after the Barcelona shoot. The green screen was useful to make the visual effects, such as the groups' holographic versions, and to unite the scenes from both groups.

Critical reception
Rhian Daly from NME rated the song four out of five stars and called it "a celestial ode to unity, hope and the power of love". She also mentioned while some might view the track as an unusual pairing, the two acts "makes complete sense" together because "both share a predilection for a poetic and heartfelt approach to their music; as well as being two of the biggest bands in the world, they are also two of modern pop's deepest thinkers, imbuing their lyrics with touching statements on love and life". In 2022, Rolling Stone wrote a "100 Best BTS Songs" editorial and ranked "My Universe" as their third-best collaboration and 62nd track overall, adding it was "Coldplay's most pleasingly unburdened moment".

Accolades
The song received five non-consecutive Melon Weekly Popularity Awards in South Korea.

Live performances
On 23 September 2021, a day before the song was officially released, Coldplay performed "My Universe" on Pandora's Small Stage Series at the Apollo Theater in New York City. Chris Martin performed a short acoustic rendition of the song as a preview during his guest appearance on The Kelly Clarkson Show, which aired the following day. On 25 September, the band performed the song at the Global Citizen Festival in New York's Central Park, with BTS appearing virtually via a pre-recorded video that played onscreen behind them. Martin also attempted to sing some of BTS' Korean verses. The following month, the band performed the song during their guest appearance on The Graham Norton Show on 15 October, at the 2021 Earthshot Prize ceremony at Alexandra Palace in London two days later (in which 60 cyclists pedalling on bikes provided the power for their performance), and as part of their closing set for Audacy's 8th annual We Can Survive charity concert held at the Hollywood Bowl in Los Angeles on 23 October.

Coldplay and BTS performed "My Universe" for the first time together at the 2021 American Music Awards on 21 November at the Microsoft Theater in Los Angeles. On 2 December, Martin joined BTS to perform the song at the latter's Permission to Dance on Stage concert at SoFi Stadium in Inglewood, California.

Track listing
CD and Digital Single
 My Universe – 3:50
 My Universe (instrumental) – 3:49

Digital (SUGA's Remix)
 My Universe (SUGA's Remix) – 3:08

Digital Single
 My Universe (Acoustic Version) – 3:43
 My Universe (Supernova 7 Mix) – 4:39
 My Universe – 3:46

Digital (Galantis Remix)
 My Universe (Galantis Remix) – 3:44

Digital (David Guetta Remix)
 My Universe (David Guetta Remix) – 3:19

Personnel 

 Coldplay – lead artist
 Guy Berryman – bass, keyboards, remixer (Supernova 7 Mix)
 Jonny Buckland – guitar, keyboards
 Will Champion – drums, percussion
 Chris Martin – vocals, guitar, keyboards
 BTS – co-lead artist, vocals
 Amber Strother – additional vocals
 Jacob Collier – additional vocals
 Bill Rahko – keyboards, programming, production, additional vocals
 Daniel Green – keyboards, programming, additional production
 Max Martin – keyboards, programming, production, additional vocals
 Oscar Holter – guitar, keyboards, programming, production
 Pdogg – vocal recording engineering, production engineering
 Randy Merrill – mastering
 Rik Simpson – additional production
 Tate McDowell – additional vocals
 The Dream Team – additional production
 Serban Ghenea – mixing engineering
 Michael Ilbert – engineering
 John Hanes – engineering
 Miguel Lara – engineering
 Emma Marks – assistant engineering
 Duncan Fuller – assistant engineering
 Connor Panayi – assistant engineering

Charts

Weekly charts

Year-end charts

Certifications and sales

Release history

See also
 List of Billboard Global 200 number ones of 2021
 List of Billboard Hot 100 number ones of 2021
 List of Billboard Hot 100 number-ones by British artists
 List of number-one songs of 2021 (Malaysia)
 List of number-one songs of 2021 (Singapore)

Notes

References

2021 singles
2021 songs
Atlantic Records singles
Billboard Hot 100 number-one singles
Billboard Global 200 number-one singles
Billboard Global Excl. U.S. number-one singles
BTS songs
Korean-language songs
Coldplay songs
Macaronic songs
Music videos directed by Dave Meyers (director)
Music videos shot in Spain
Number-one singles in Malaysia
Number-one singles in Singapore
Parlophone singles
Song recordings produced by Max Martin
Songs written by Chris Martin
Songs written by Guy Berryman
Songs written by J-Hope
Songs written by Jonny Buckland
Songs written by Max Martin
Songs written by RM (rapper)
Songs written by Suga (rapper)
Songs written by Will Champion